Judi Oyama is a professional skateboarder. She was inducted into the Skateboarding Hall of Fame in 2018.

Career 
Oyama began her skating career in the mid-1970s at age 16 and was sponsored by Santa Cruz Skateboards. She is one of few Asian-American women professional skateboarders.

Her skating helmet from 1979 and 1st place trophy from the 4th Berkeley Contest are held in the collection of the Smithsonian's National Museum of American History.

In 2003, Oyama won the Slalom World Championships at age 43 and was ranked second in the US and first in the masters division overall in 2013. In 2015, she became the first woman to win the N-Men Icon Award.

Oyama is the former Vice-President and one of the founders of the 501(c)(3) nonprofit - Board Rescue.

References 

Living people
Year of birth missing (living people)
American skateboarders
Female skateboarders
Asian athletes